Basketball was one of the 36 sports featured at the 17th Asian Games 2014, which took place in Incheon, South Korea on 20 September – 3 October 2014. The event was held at the 7,406 seat Samsan World Gymnasium, and the 5,158 seat Hwaseong Indoor Arena.

Schedule

Medalists

Medal table

Draw
The teams were seeded based on their final ranking at the 2010 Asian Games.

Men
The best 8 teams from the basketball competition of the 2010 Asian Games that were participating in 2014 directly entered the second round. The teams were distributed according to their position at the 2010 Asian Games using the serpentine system for their distribution.

Qualifying round – Group A

Qualifying round – Group B

Preliminary round – Group C
 (1)
 (9)
2nd Qualifying round – Group B

Preliminary round – Group D
 (2)
 (7)
2nd Qualifying round – Group A

Preliminary round – Group E
 (3)
 (6)
1st Qualifying round – Group B

Preliminary round – Group F
 (4)
 (5)
1st Qualifying round – Group A

Women
The best 6 teams from the basketball competition of the 2010 Asian Games that were participating in 2014 directly entered the knockout round. The teams were distributed according to their position at the 2010 Asian Games using the serpentine system for their distribution.

Qualifying round

Quarterfinals
 (1) vs. 2nd Qualifying round
 (2) vs. 1st Qualifying round
 (3) vs.  (7)
 (4) vs.  (5)

Final standing

Men

Women

References 

 
Basketball
2014
International basketball competitions hosted by South Korea
2014–15 in Asian basketball
2014–15 in South Korean basketball